Dickeya is a genus of the family Pectobacteriaceae that consists mainly of pathogens from herbaceous plants.  Dickeya is the result of the reclassification of 75 strains of Pectobacterium chrysanthemi, as well as Brenneria paradisiaca CFBP 4178, into a new genus. The genus is named for American phytopathologist Robert S. Dickey. Several species in this genus, such as Dickeya dadantii, are known phytopathogens.

Species now placed here include:
 Dickeya aquatica
 Dickeya chrysanthemi 
 Dickeya dadantii (D. chrysanthemi)
 Dickeya dianthicola
 Dickeya dieffenbachiae
 Dickeya paradisiaca
 Dickeya solani 
 Dickeya zeae

References

External links

NCBI Taxonomy

Bacteria genera